Thomas Oosthuizen (born 2 April 1988) is a South African professional boxer. He is a former IBO world champion in two weight classes, having held the super-middleweight title from 2011 to 2014, and the light-heavyweight title in 2015.

Professional career

Oosthuizen made his professional debut on 29 February 2008, knocking out Johannes Swart in two rounds. He then reeled off twelve straight victories, nine of which coming by way of knockout.

IBO super-middleweight champion
On 6 November 2010, Oosthuizen faced off against IBO Super Middleweight titleholder Isaac Chilemba. The result was a split-decision draw which allowed Chilemba to retain the title, Oosthuizen claims that attempted to make a rematch were swiftly declined. On 26 March 2011, Oosthuizen got a second crack at the IBO title against Evert Bravo (Chilemba had vacated the title to move up to the Light Heavyweight class). Oosthuizen won the fight via a ninth-round technical knockout, which saw the referee stepping in to save Bravo from taking further punishment. Oosthuizen made his American debut on the undercard of Andre Berto vs. Jan Zaveck, winning a unanimous decision over Aaron Pryor Jr on 3 September 2011.

After two seemingly lackluster performances (a draw with Brandon Gonzáles and split decision victory over Ezequiel Maderna), a motorcycle injury forced Oosthuizen to withdraw from a scheduled bout fight with Eleider Alvarez. He was subsequently released by his promoter Rodney Berman, who cited the fact that Oosthuizen was at least 13 pounds over the 175 lb. limit for the bout; stating, "He's had so many chances and blown every one". Following a brief stint in rehabilitation, Oosthuizen was able to mend ties with his promoter in an attempt to move forward with his boxing career. He vacated his IBO Super Middleweight Title on 21 April 2014.

Professional boxing record

References

External links

1989 births
Living people
Super-middleweight boxers
Southpaw boxers
International Boxing Organization champions
African Boxing Union champions
Afrikaner people
South African people of Dutch descent
Sportspeople from Gauteng
South African male boxers
Light-heavyweight boxers
Cruiserweight boxers